Shatu is a town in Mudan District, Heze, Shandong, People's Republic of China, situated on China National Highway 327 more than  east of downtown Heze. , it has 40 villages under its administration.

See also 
 List of township-level divisions of Shandong

References 

Township-level divisions of Shandong